Pe'er Tasi (born 10 May 1984) is an Israeli singer and songwriter in the Mizrahi genre.

Biography 
Tasi was born on 10 May 1984 in Israeli town Pardes Hanna-Karkur, and is of Yemenite Jewish ancestry. He began singing at age six in the Yemenite synagogue in his neighborhood. In his youth, he sang in karaoke clubs and parties.

Tasi served in the Israel Defense Forces as a combat soldier in the Kfir Brigade. Following the completion of his military service, he was a hotel singer for the Fattal hotel management company. After two years, Tasi left the hotel business and began working on his debut album. In 2009, he released his first single, followed by three others released in 2010, 2011, and 2013. In 2013, he won first place in a musical competition with a song he later released as a single. He released three more singles that year. In November 2013, his debut album, which he had worked on for four years, was released. Between 2014 and 2017, his musical career and popularity grew as he continued to release singles and albums. Among his singles was the extremely popular hit Derech Hashalom.

Personal life 
Tasi married Tal Shoshan on 15 September 2015. Their daughter, Hillel, was born on January 4, 2017, followed by a son in 2018 and another son in 2020.

Discography 
Studio albums
 Peer Tasi (Album Habchora) (2013)
 Kocha Shel Ahava (2015)
 Ma Nashim Rozot (2016)
 Shachor O Lavan (2017)
 Hafooch L'Shneinu (2018)
 Perek Alef Nigmar (2021)
 Radio Shetach (2022)

See also 
 List of Israeli musical artists

References

External links 

1984 births
Living people
21st-century Mizrahi Jews
21st-century Israeli male singers
Israeli male singer-songwriters
Israeli people of Yemeni-Jewish descent
Israeli pop singers
Jewish Israeli singers
Jewish songwriters
People from Pardes Hanna-Karkur
Mizrahi singers